X1 was a South Korean boy group formed by CJ ENM through the Mnet reality competition show Produce X 101. The group was composed of eleven members: Kim Yo-han, Kim Woo-seok, Han Seung-woo, Song Hyeong-jun, Cho Seung-youn, Son Dong-pyo, Lee Han-gyul, Nam Do-hyon, Cha Jun-ho, Kang Min-hee and Lee Eun-sang. The group debuted on August 27, 2019 with the single "Flash" under Swing Entertainment and was co-managed by Stone Music Entertainment.

Initially contracted for five years, the Mnet vote manipulation investigation led to a halt in their activities, and after an unsuccessful negotiation about the group's future between the members' individual agencies, they disbanded on January 6, 2020.

History

Pre-debut: Produce X 101
X1 was formed through the survival competition series Produce X 101, which aired on Mnet from May 3, 2019, until July 19, 2019. Out of an initial 101 trainees participating, the final 10 were chosen out of the remaining 20 trainees in the final week of the show. The final member, known as the rank X member, was selected from the remaining trainees based on the highest number of cumulative votes. All members were announced via the final episode, which was broadcast live on July 19, 2019.

Prior to the program, many of the members have already been active in the music industry. Cho Seung-youn debuted as a member of Uniq in 2014. He also debuted as a solo artist and music producer under the stage name Luizy in 2016, before changing it to WOODZ in 2018. He is known for producing the Idol Producer debut evaluation song "It's Ok". Kim Woo-seok debuted in Up10tion under the name Wooshin in September 2015 and he was also the host of SBS MTV's The Show alongside Produce 101 season 1 contestant and former I.O.I member Jeon So-mi in 2016. Han Seung-woo debuted as a member and the leader of Victon in November 2016. Lee Han-gyul previously debuted as a member of Yama and Hotchicks Entertainment's ballad group IM and competed with his fellow IM members in KBS2's The Unit where he ended up in 13th place. Fellow MBK trainee Nam Do-hyon was a contestant in MBC's Under Nineteen as a member of the Rap Team and ended up in 42nd place on the show. Member Kang Minhee was featured in the music video for Mad Clown and Ailee's song "Thirst" in 2018.

Their contract was intended to be for five years following their debut, with the first half being an exclusive contract and the other half of the period being a non-exclusive contract, meaning that the individual members can return to co-promote with their original agencies after the first half of their contract was over.

2019: Debut and vote manipulation investigation

After the program, the winning eleven contestants debuted under Stone Music's Swing Entertainment, the label which housed the Produce 101 winner Wanna One. However, following a civil lawsuit filed against Mnet due to Produce X 101'''s vote manipulation allegations, several brands cancelled their endorsement deals with X1 or put them on hold. Some of the agencies of the contestants refused to sign until the allegations cleared up. In spite of this, X1's debut proceeded as planned.

Ahead of debut, the group's reality show X1 Flash premiered on August 22, 2019 through Mnet. The reality show follows the members as they prepare for their debut, and gives a glimpse into their daily lives. The group debuted on August 27, 2019 with a debut showcase at Gocheok Sky Dome. On August 1, it was announced that their debut album would be titled Emergency: Quantum Leap with the title track "Flash", composed by Score, Megatone and Onestar. On September 3, X1 won their first-ever music show win through SBS MTV's The Show one week after debut. They received 11 wins in total for their debut song, "Flash" with their 11th win being on M Countdown on September 19.

On November 5, 2019, Ahn Joon-young, the producer of Produce X 101, was arrested, and he later admitted to manipulating the vote rankings. Subsequently, X1 had several public appearances cancelled and Mnet announced that plans for the group's promotion were on hold. On December 30, 2019, CJ ENM announced that members and their agencies were in discussions on the group's future.

2020: Disbandment
On January 6, 2020, CJ ENM, Swing Entertainment, and the members' individual agencies held a meeting to determine the future of the group. After deliberating for an hour about whether the group should continue promoting or disband, a secret ballot was held by the members' agencies. The agencies agreed prior to voting that the group could only continue if there was unanimous agreement or else the group would disband. Four agencies voted to continue, four agencies voted to disband, and one agency whose vote was unclear was ultimately discarded. Thus, it was determined that the group would disband. Although X1 members were not invited to the meeting, Swing CEO Cho Yoo-myung expressed their collective desire to have attended.

After the group's disbandment was decided, CJ ENM suggested that a previously recorded winter track be released as a goodbye song, but the idea was rejected by two or three of the members' agencies. Similarly, a suggestion from a member's agency to record a final video was rejected by another agency.

The disbandment was controversial among the fanbase of the group, One It, because they felt that the disbandment of the group was unfair. They staged protests on CJ ENM, demanding that CJ ENM relaunch the group. To make their demands clear, One Its sent trucks with LED screens to promote their movement. According to Soompi, approximately 1,000 fans were involved in the three hour protest.

Members
 Kim Yo-han (김요한)
 Kim Woo-seok (김우석)
 Han Seung-woo (한승우) – leader
 Song Hyeong-jun (송형준)
 Cho Seung-youn (조승연)
 Son Dong-pyo (손동표)
 Lee Han-gyul (이한결)
 Nam Do-hyon (남도현)
 Cha Jun-ho (차준호)
 Kang Min-hee (강민희)
 Lee Eun-sang (이은상)

 Achievements 
Prior to debut, X1 made their Billboard chart debut on the charts Social 50 and Emerging Artists at number six and number eleven respectively.Emergency: Quantum Leap sold over 500,000 physical copies in the first week of sales, breaking the record of the highest first week sales for a debut album in South Korea; the record was previously set by solo artist, Kang Daniel with his debut album, Color on Me''.

On July 26, 2020, the group's debut and only music video "Flash" reached over 100 million views on Youtube. In doing so, "Flash" became the fastest boy group debut music video to reach 100 million views on Youtube, taking 334 days to reach that number.

Discography

Extended plays

Singles

Other charted songs

Filmography

Television

Music videos

Awards and nominations

V Live Awards

Melon Music Awards

Mnet Asian Music Awards

Gaon Chart Music Awards

Seoul Music Awards

Notes

References

External links

K-pop music groups
Musical groups established in 2019
South Korean boy bands
South Korean dance music groups
South Korean pop music groups
Swing Entertainment artists
Musical groups from Seoul
Singing talent show winners
Produce 101
Produce 101 contestants
2019 establishments in South Korea
2020 disestablishments in South Korea